is a subway station on the Tōhō Line in Toyohira-ku, Sapporo, Hokkaido, Japan, operated by Sapporo Municipal Subway. The station is numbered H11.

The station takes its name from Toyohira Park, located nearby.

Platforms

Surrounding area
 Japan National Route 36 (to Muroran)
 Toyohira Park
 Hokkaido Prefectural Sports Center, (connected directly by an underground passage)
 Toyohira Post Office

External links

 Sapporo Subway Stations

 

Railway stations in Japan opened in 1994
Railway stations in Sapporo
Sapporo Municipal Subway
Toyohira-ku, Sapporo